Hock burns are marks found on the upper joints of chickens and other birds raised on broiler farms. These marks are where the ammonia from the waste of other birds has burned through the skin of the leg, leaving a mark. Many meat processors now remove these marks as they discourage customers. Hock burn normally does not surpass 15% of a flock, according to poultry industry standards, but independent studies have found incidents of hock burn more common. Researchers in Britain found that hock burn could be identified in 82% of chickens sold in supermarkets.

See also
Battery cage
Broiler
Factory farming

References

External links
Compassion In World Farming broiler farming campaign

Poultry farming
Poultry diseases
Animal welfare
Cruelty to animals